Mansour Kamardine (born 23 March 1959 in Sada, Mayotte) is a French lawyer and politician of the Republicans (LR) who has served as a member of the French National Assembly from 2002 until 2007 and again since 2017, representing Mayotte. He is the MP for Mayotte's 2nd constituency.

References 

 page on the French National Assembly website

Mayotte politicians
1959 births
Living people
The Republicans (France) politicians
Deputies of the 12th National Assembly of the French Fifth Republic
Deputies of the 15th National Assembly of the French Fifth Republic
People from Mayotte
Deputies from Mayotte
Black French politicians